Bozkurt is a town in the Kastamonu Province in the Black Sea region of Turkey. It is the seat of Bozkurt District. Its population is 5,329 (2021).

Image gallery

References

Populated places in Kastamonu Province
Bozkurt District, Kastamonu
Towns in Turkey